Laura Vilagrà i Pons (born 3 July 1976) is a Spanish politician from Catalonia, member of the Parliament of Catalonia and the current Minister of the Presidency of Catalonia.

Early life
Vilagrà was born on 3 July 1976 in Santpedor, Catalonia. She has a degree in political science and administration from the Autonomous University of Barcelona and a master's degree in public management from ESADE. She joined Republican Left of Catalonia (ERC) in 1999.

Career
Vilagrà worked as a political advisor to ERC municipal councillors. She was a member of Bages County Council from 1999 to 2003.

Vilagrà contested the 1999 local elections as an ERC candidate in Santpedor and was elected. She was re-elected at the 2003 local elections and became Mayor of Santpedor. She was re-elected at the 2007 and 2011 local elections.

At the 2006 regional election Vilagrà was placed 14th on ERC's list of candidates in the Province of Barcelona but the party only managed to win 11 seats in the province and as a result she failed to get elected. However, in December 2006, she was appointed to the Parliament of Catalonia following the resignation of Oriol Amorós i March. She was re-elected at the 2010 regional election. She resigned from Parliament in June 2011 due to increased workload and personal reasons.

At the 2012 regional election Vilagrà was placed 24th on the Republican Left of Catalonia–Catalonia Yes electoral alliance's list of candidates in the Province of Barcelona but the alliance only managed to win 12 seats in the province and as a result she failed to get elected.

Vilagrà was the Government of Catalonia's delegate in Central Catalonia from 2016 till the imposition of direct rule in 2017. She became manager of the Fundació Tutelar Santa Maria de Comabella in 2018. She was appointed manager of Bages County Council in 2019.

Vilagrà contested the 2021 regional election as an ERC candidate in the Province of Barcelona and was elected to the Parliament of Catalonia. On 26 May 2021 she was sworn in as Minister of the Presidency in the new government of President Pere Aragonès.

Personal life
Vilagrà is a member of Òmnium Cultural and of the swimming club in Santpedor and has been a swimming instructor for many years. She is the mother of two daughters.

Electoral history

References

External links

1976 births
Aragonès Government
Autonomous University of Barcelona alumni
ESADE alumni
Government ministers of Catalonia
Living people
Mayors of places in Catalonia
Members of the 8th Parliament of Catalonia
Members of the 9th Parliament of Catalonia
Members of the 13th Parliament of Catalonia
People from Bages
Republican Left of Catalonia politicians
Women members of the Parliament of Catalonia